Delbert C. Gee is a retired Judge of the Superior Court of California (United States) for the County of Alameda, and served from his appointment in 2002 by the Governor of the State of California until his retirement in 2022. 

The Honorable Delbert Gee presided primarily over a civil direct calendar and trial court and a criminal felony and misdemeanor calendar and trial court during his 20 year judicial career.  He also presided over a probate, conservatorship, and guardianship court, collaborative and drug courts, and a juvenile dependency and delinquency court.  He was the last judge to preside over criminal cases in the Alameda courthouse, and he presided over two civil jury trials conducted entirely by video during the COVID-19 pandemic.  He was a member of the court's executive committee, and was the supervising judge of the Alameda courthouse and the court's probate departments.

In 2002, he was honored by the Asian American Bar Association of the Greater Bay Area, and was presented in 2010 with the Judicial Distinguished Service Award by the Alameda County Bar Association and a resolution in his honor by the California State Assembly.

Judge Gee began his legal career as a Deputy District Attorney in Ventura County where he tried 33 jury trials to verdict, and then spent the next 20 years in San Francisco, first as an associate with Hassard, Bonnington, Rogers & Huber and with Bronson, Bronson & McKinnon, and later as a partner with Sturgeon, Keller, Phillips, Gee & O'Leary PC and with the Pacific West Law Group LLP, specializing in health and liability insurance coverage litigation, medical malpractice litigation, and health care law. 

He graduated from the University of California, Davis in 1977 where he was a Congressional intern in Washington, D.C., and from the Santa Clara University School of Law in December 1979 where he was an associate editor of the Santa Clara Law Review and clerked for the Criminal Division of the U.S. Attorney's office in San Jose. 

Judge Gee was born and raised in Alameda County by immigrant parents who never had an opportunity to attend college, and has been active for decades in numerous professional, civic and service organizations in the San Francisco Bay Area.

See also
Alameda County Superior Court
Hayward Hall of Justice
List of Asian American jurists
List of University of California, Davis alumni
Livermore High School
Bazaar Canton

Notes

Living people
People from Alameda County, California
California state court judges
University of California, Davis alumni
Santa Clara University alumni
People from Livermore, California
Year of birth missing (living people)